The Witch of the Low Tide, first published in 1961, is a detective story/historical novel by John Dickson Carr set in the England of 1907.  This novel is a mystery of the type known as a locked room mystery (or a subset of that type called an "impossible mystery") as well as being a historical novel.

Plot summary

David Garth, M.D., has fallen in love with the beautiful widow, Lady Betty Calder.  

Detective-Inspector Twigg of Scotland Yard tries to warn Dr. Garth about the chequered past of Lady Calder, but it takes all the nerve of Garth's friend, Cullingford Abbot, assistant to the Commissioner of Scotland Yard, to state that, among other things, Betty danced for three seasons at the Moulin Rouge and is thought to have joined a Satanist group in Paris. She is also reputed to be a blackmailer responsible for at least two suicides. 

However, Betty herself raises the possibility that she is being mistaken for the machinations of her sister Glynis. 

When Glynis is found dead on the beach near a bathing-pavilion, in the middle of a stretch of unmarked sand, Betty is suspected of arranging the death (although no one can suggest how it might have happened). 

It takes Dr. Garth's special knowledge of both medicine (the new science of "psychoanalysis", which suggests that abuse of a child may be the fault of the child and that the abuser may be innocent) and literature, like Gaston Leroux's The Mystery of the Yellow Room, to solve the impossible crime and reveal the criminal.

 

1961 American novels
Novels by John Dickson Carr
Fiction set in 1907
Historical mystery novels
Novels set in the 1900s
Locked-room mysteries
Hamish Hamilton books